Edgewood Golf Course may refer to:

 Edgewood Tahoe Resort, on the south shore of Lake Tahoe in Stateline, Nevada.
 Edgewood Golf Course, in Fargo, North Dakota.